Match of the Seventies is a British sports documentary television series which aired on BBC 1 in two series between 26 July 1995 and 2 September 1996. Presented by Dennis Waterman it featured highlights of the English football seasons during the 1970s. It begins in the summer of 1970, shortly after England's defeat in the World Cup in a season in which Arsenal won the double and concludes at the end of the 1979-1980 season with an increasingly dominant Liverpool side retaining their league title.

Each episode featured a string of pop and rock songs which were released around the same time as the footballing events which were being recalled.

The series was able to utilise the BBC's Match of the Day archives. It was part of the growing boom in nostalgia for the decade. Waterman, a football fan, had become a television star during the decade in The Sweeney and remained closely associated with that era. It was subsequently followed by Match of the Eighties, presented by Danny Baker, but which for legal reasons did not cover the whole decade.

References

Bibliography
 Hunt, Leon. British Low Culture: From Safari Suits to Sexploitation. Routledge, 2013.
 Vahimagi, Tise. British Television: An Illustrated Guide. Oxford University Press, 1996.

External links
 

BBC television documentaries
1995 British television series debuts
1996 British television series endings
1990s British sports television series
English-language television shows